I Was Possessed is an American reality television series based on true life accounts of possession, premiered on July 11, 2015, in the United States, on LMN.

Episodes

References

External links 
 
 

2015 American television series debuts
2015 American television series endings
2015 American television seasons